Linda Joy Stern, née Hart (21 December 1941 – 10 September 2006) was an English judge and prosecutor, known for prosecuting rape and child abuse cases.

Early life and education
Linda Joy Hart was born in London in 1941, the daughter of Lionel Hart and Lily Rachel Gold. Her family was Jewish. Her father worked as a scientist during World War II and died in a laboratory incident shortly before she was born. Her stepfather was Ally Saville. She was educated at St Paul's Girls' School in London.

Career
Hart was called to the Bar at Gray's Inn in 1971. In 1972, she became the first woman member of the Red Lion Chambers. In 1987 Stern won permission to use a new genetic paternity test in court to prove a sexual assault case, a first in an English criminal court.

Stern was appointed a QC in 1991. Stern was known for prosecuting murder, rape, and child abuse cases; most notably, she was prosecutor in the Victoria Climbié murder trial. She was a recorder of the Crown Court from 1990 to 2001, and was a circuit judge from 2001 to 2006.

Stern was elected a Fellow of the Royal Society of Arts in 1993.

Personal life 
Linda Joy Hart married twice. She married her first husband, Michael Brian Rose, in 1961. They had two sons, Ian and Jeremy, before Rose died in 1976. She married her second husband, commodities broker Nigel Maurice Stern, in 1978. She died from cancer in 2006, aged 64 years, in London.

References 

1941 births
2006 deaths
20th-century English judges
English Jews
Lawyers from London
20th-century King's Counsel
People educated at St Paul's Girls' School
English King's Counsel
British women lawyers
20th-century women lawyers
21st-century English lawyers